Edward Southwell may refer to:

 Edward Southwell, 20th Baron de Clifford (1738–1777), British politician
 Edward Southwell Sr. (1671–1730), Irish politician
 Edward Southwell Jr. (1705–1755), Irish politician